The Cementation Company was a large British construction business. It was eventually acquired by Trafalgar House, and is now part of Skanska.

History
The company was established by Albert Francois, a Belgian who had been striving to improve grouting associated with shaft sinking for coal mining, as the Francois Cementation Company based at Doncaster in 1910.

The company began to struggle and was in need of strong direction. One of the board members John Alexander Agnew, a director and later Chairman of Consolidated Goldfields asked his son-in-law Abram Rupert Neelands, a Canadian mining engineer to look over the company and report its prospects. The shareholders were impressed with a report produced by Rupert, and asked if he could commit to the company. The offer was accepted on the basis Rupert had 'full charge and complete control', and he took over management of the business in 1921. Through the vision of Rupert a small profit started to be released. In 1941, the company was renamed as the Cementation Company.

During World War II it undertook the grouting of 15 runways. In the 1950s, it undertook grouting for several major dams including the Kariba Dam on the border between Zambia and Zimbabwe and the Dukan Dam in Iraq. Then in 1967 it acquired Cleveland Bridge & Engineering Company. The Cementation Company was acquired by Trafalgar House in 1970. In 1984, British Prime Minister Margaret Thatcher faced conflict-of-interest questions in the House of Commons in relation to the involvement of her son Mark in representing Cementation in its bid to build a university in Oman at a time when the Prime Minister was urging Omanis to buy British. In 2001, it became part of Skanska.

References

Sources

British companies established in 1910
Companies based in Doncaster
Construction and civil engineering companies of the United Kingdom
1910 establishments in England
Construction and civil engineering companies established in 1910